Piers Coleman (born 1958) is a British-born theoretical physicist, working in the field of theoretical condensed matter physics. Coleman is Professor of Physics at  Rutgers University in New Jersey and at Royal Holloway, University of London.

Education and career

Coleman was raised in Cheltenham, England, where he attended Cheltenham Grammar School, graduating in 1976.  He completed his undergraduate education at Trinity College, Cambridge, pursuing the Natural Sciences Tripos and the Mathematics Tripos part III under the mentorship of Gilbert Lonzarich. In 1980 he won a Jane Eliza Procter Fellowship to Princeton University where he studied theoretical condensed matter physics with Philip Warren Anderson. Contemporaries in the Princeton graduate physics program included Gabriel Kotliar, Cumrun Vafa, Nathan Mhyrvold and Jennifer Chayes. He was awarded a Junior Research Fellowship at Trinity College, Cambridge, which he held from 1983 to 1988.  He was a postdoctoral Fellow at the Kavli Institute for Theoretical Physics Santa Barbara from 1984 to 1986. He joined the faculty at Rutgers University in 1987. Since 2010 he has also held the position of University of London Chair of Theoretical Condensed Matter Physics at Royal Holloway, University of London. In 2011, Piers Coleman replaced David Pines as a director of the Institute for Complex Adaptive Matter.

Research
Coleman is known for his work related to strongly correlated electron systems, and in particular, the study of magnetism, superconductivity and topological insulators. He is the author of the popular text Introduction to Many-Body Physics.

In his early career at Princeton University Coleman worked on the problem of valence fluctuations in solids.  In the 1960s the physicist John Hubbard introduced a mathematical operator, the "Hubbard operator" for describing the restricted fluctuations in valence between two charge states of an ion.  In 1983 Coleman invented the slave boson formulation of the Hubbard operators, which involves the factorization of a Hubbard operator into a canonical fermion and a boson . The use of canonical fermions enabled
the Hubbard operators to be treated within a field-theoretic approach, allowing the first mean-field treatments of the heavy fermion problem. 
The slave boson approach has since been widely applied to strongly correlated electron systems, and has proven useful in developing the resonating valence bond theory (RVB) of high temperature superconductivity and the understanding of heavy fermion compounds.

At Rutgers, he became interested in the interplay of magnetism with strong electron correlations. With Natan Andrei he adapted the resonating valence bond theory of high temperature superconductivity to heavy fermion superconductivity.  In 1990 with Anatoly Larkin and Premi Chandra, they explored the effect of thermal and zero-point magnetic fluctuations  on two dimensional frustrated Heisenberg magnets. Conventional wisdom maintained that because of the Mermin–Wagner theorem, two dimensional Heisenberg magnets are unable to develop any form of long-range order.  Chandra, Coleman and Larkin demonstrated that frustration can lead to a finite temperature Ising phase  transition into a striped state with long range spin-nematic order. This kind of order is now known to develop in high temperature iron-based superconductors.

Working with Alexei Tsvelik, Coleman carried out some of the earliest applications of Majorana Fermions to condensed matter problems.  In 1992,
Coleman, Miranda and Tsvelik examined the application of the Majorana representation of spins  to the Kondo lattice, showing that if local moments fractionalize as Majorana, rather than Dirac fermions, the resulting ground-state is
an odd-frequency superconductor. Working with Andrew Schofield and Alexei Tsvelik, they later advanced a model to account for the unusual magneto-resistance properties of high temperature superconductors in their normal state, in which the electrons fractionalize into 
Majorana fermions.

In the late 1990s, Coleman became interested in the breakdown of Fermi liquid behavior at a  quantum critical point.  Working with Gabriel Aeppli and Hilbert von Löhneysen, they demonstrated established the presence of local quantum critical fluctuations in the quantum critical metal CeCu6-xAux, identified as a consequence of the break-down of the Kondo effect that accompanies the development of magnetism. This led to the prediction that the Fermi surface will change discontinuously at a quantum critical point, a result later observed in field tuned quantum criticality in the material YbRh2Si2 and in pressure-tuned quantum criticality in the material CeRhIn5.

After the discovery of topological insulators, Coleman became interested in whether topological insulating behavior could exist in materials with strong correlation.  In 2008, the team of
Maxim Dzero, Kai Sun and Victor Galitski and Piers Coleman predicted that the class of Kondo insulators can develop a topological ground-state, proposing samarium hexaboride (SmB6) as a Topological Kondo Insulator. The observation of the development of robust conducting surface states in SmB6 is consistent with this early prediction.

Notable former research students and postdoctoral fellows in his group include Ian Ritchey, Eduardo Miranda,  Andrew Schofield, Maxim Dzero, Andriy Nevidomskyy and Rebecca Flint

Personal life

Piers Coleman is married to the American theoretical physicist Premala Chandra and they have two sons. He is the elder brother of musician and composer Jaz Coleman.

Science outreach

Along with his younger brother Jaz, Coleman worked on a concert and physics outreach website Music of the Quantum. The concert has pieces composed by Jaz Coleman, based on themes from physics such as quantum criticality, emergence and symmetry breaking. They delivered performances of Music of the Quantum at the Bethlehem Chapel in Prague and at Columbia University in New York.  He has also produced a short documentary on Emergence with Paul Chaikin, as part of the Annenberg series Physics in the 21st Century.

Awards and honors

Coleman was awarded a Sloan Fellowship in 1988.  In 2002 he was elected a Fellow of the American Physical Society "for innovative approaches to the theory of strongly correlated electron systems". In 2018 he was elected to the board of the Aspen Center for Physics. His research is supported by the National Science Foundation, Division of Materials Theory, and the Department of Energy, division of Basic Energy Sciences.

Books

See also 
 Zlatko Tesanovic

References

External links

Music of the Quantum website

21st-century American physicists
20th-century American physicists
20th-century British physicists
21st-century British physicists
Fellows of the American Physical Society
Rutgers University faculty
Living people
1958 births
Theoretical physicists
British emigrants to the United States
American condensed matter physicists
Alumni of the University of Cambridge
Princeton University alumni
People from Cheltenham
21st-century American non-fiction writers
21st-century British non-fiction writers
British people of Bengali descent
American people of Bengali descent
Academics of Royal Holloway, University of London